The following is the list of ambassadors of Malta to France.  These are the Maltese diplomats who served as ambassadors to France since 1981.

List of Ambassadors

Leslie N. Agius - 30/07/1981
Albert Borg Olivier de Puget - 02/10/1987
J. Licari - 07/10/1991
Vincent Camilleri - 11/02/1997
Prof. Salvino Busuttil - 16/03/1999
Dr Vicki Ann Cremona - 04/07/2005
Mark A. Miggiani - 02/07/2009
Pierre Clive Agius - 11/12/2012
Vincent Camilleri - 15/11/2013
Patrick Mifsud - 09/11/2016
Helga Mizzi - 13/10/2017
Carmelo Inguanez -09/12/2019

References

Malta
France